Luigi Mannelli (21 February 1939 – 14 March 2017) was an Italian water polo player who competed in the 1956 Summer Olympics and in the 1960 Summer Olympics.

He was born in Naples.

In 1956 he was a member of the Italian water polo team which finished fourth in the Olympic tournament. He played one match.

Four years later he won the gold medal with the Italian team in the Olympic tournament. He played two matches and scored four goals.

See also
 Italy men's Olympic water polo team records and statistics
 List of Olympic champions in men's water polo
 List of Olympic medalists in water polo (men)

References

External links
 

1939 births
2017 deaths
Italian male water polo players
Water polo players at the 1956 Summer Olympics
Water polo players at the 1960 Summer Olympics
Olympic gold medalists for Italy in water polo
Medalists at the 1960 Summer Olympics
Water polo players from Naples